Shokhinsky is a rural locality (a khutor) in Sirotinskoye Rural Settlement, Ilovlinsky District, Volgograd Oblast, Russia. The population was 208 as of 2010. There are 2 streets.

Geography 
Shokhinsky is located in forest steppe, between Don, Ilovlya and Volga Rivers, on south of the Volga Upland, 58 km west of Ilovlya (the district's administrative centre) by road. Kamyshinsky is the nearest rural locality.

References 

Rural localities in Ilovlinsky District